The Wertachtal transmitter site in Bavaria, Germany, was from 1972 to 2013 the biggest shortwave broadcasting facility in Europe. It was located in the valley of the Wertach River near the village of Amberg (Swabia), and was originally operated by Deutsche Bundespost, and later by Media Broadcast GmbH. Before the site was closed, it included 14 500 kW radio transmitters and two 100 kW radio transmitters. It was built in 1969 and demolished in 2014.

Location 
The transmitters and more than 85% of the antennas were located on the territory of the village of Amberg, and the rest of the antennas in Langerringen, in the Wertach valley.

Technical data 

In 2008, there were 14 transmitters of 500 kW each and two transmitters of 100 kW. There were 34 towers in all, constructed from of steel.
Two 110 kV electrical power lines supplied power. The site used about 20 MW of power.

History 
After German shortwave broadcaster Deutsche Welle was founded in 1953, the Jülich radio transmitter was built in 1956 to transit shortwave radio broadcasts. In preparation for the 1972 Summer Olympics at Munich, Deutsche Welle decided to build a new transmitter site because the nine 100 kW transmitters in Jülich were too small. Construction began in 1969 on a  near Amberg. The transmitters were supplied by AEG-Telefunken and the antennas by Brown, Boveri & Cie.
About 600 people worked to build the site. By September 1971, six out of 25 towers had been completed, with heights reading to 125 m. They held the first antennas, directed towards North America and the Near East. The same year, the first three 500 kW transmitters were installed by AEG-Telefunken. Five transmitters needed to be installed before the beginning of the Summer Olympics.
Test transmissions began on 10 April 1970 using the 500 kW transmitters; they stopped at the beginning of the Olympics. One of the four transmitters was used to transmit the Olympic program ARD-Olympiawelle on 5995 kHz while the others were used for foreign-language broadcasts. After the Olympics finished, the site was used by Germany's national shortwave broadcaster Deutsche Welle. In the following years until 2012, additional 500 kW transmitters were installed, also supplied by AEG-Telefunken. 
Starting in 1987, foreign broadcasters also used the Wertachtal site, including Voice of America, Radio Canada International and Radio Nederland Wereldomroep. Since Voice of America wanted a long-term lease on the transmitters, new antennas were installed replacing the old ones. On 31 December 1995, Voice of America stopped broadcasting from Wertachtal, and Deutsche Welle decided to move its transmissions from the site in Jülich to Wertachtal and Nauen (Brandebourg). For this, a new quadrant-antenna was installed for transmissions to Europe.Other broadcasters using the site included Adventist World Radio from 1996, et Family Radio from 2001.
In 2003 a new design transmitter was installed that could operate at 500 kW in conventional (AM ) or 200 kW in Digital Radio Mondiale (DRM), a new broadcasting standard. This was a joint venture of T-Systems, Telefunken Sendertechnik (which became TRANSRADIO Sendersysteme Berlin, which no longer exists), and of RIZ Zagreb. 
At the end of 2006, Deutsche Welle discontinued its transmissions from Wertachtal, and moved them to a site at Woofferton in England. On 15 January 2008, the Wertachtal transmitter site was sold to Media Broadcast GmbH.
In April 2013, all but four broadcasts (some religious stations were the exceptions) were transferred to the Nauen transmitter site, which was then at full capacity, with 60 broadcasts per day.

On 1 May 2013, the remaining broadcasts were transferred to Nauen, but the Wertachtal centre remained in working order.

Antenna assembly 

The antennas are set as a three-pointed star.
During first expansion stage there were 52 antennas for long-distance transmission (24 of them for 3-band and 28 for 2-band use) so as 11 lines of dipoles as 2-band-antennas for short-distance transmission. In final state there were built up 67 antennas. All antennas were equipped with pivoting (or slewing) switches to tilt the main antenna-beam to +/- 5, 15 or 30 degrees. The antennas were furnished by German affiliate of Swiss BBC (today Ampegon) at Mannheim.
To fulfill the necessity to connect any of the 16 transmitters to any of the 67 antennas, a cross-point switching matrix of  height with more than 1.000 elements was built up. 
In addition to the curtain-antennas primarily existed five log-periodic antennas with horizontal polarization, consisting in two radiators with 26 dipoles each, built up side by side. The main beam could be tilt to +/- 20 degrees by pivoting (or slewing) switches. They were furnished by Telefunken.
As omnidirectional antennas for shorter distances (central Europe) six quadrant antennas were mounted, each usable for two proximate frequencies. In the middle of the 80s the antenna-set was changed due to the intention of Voice of America to intensify transmitting in direction of Eastern Europe (in political meaning) and to North Africa. All but one (No 224) of the log-periodic antennas were removed.

The antennas, their frequencies and directions at final state

Bank 1, Nord

Bank 2, South-East

Bank 3, South-West 

Description to mode
F = long distance antenna, N = short distance antenna,Q = quadrant antenna (omnidirectional), L = log-periodic antenna,B = horizontal wide beam (about 45°), S = horizontal narrow beam (about 30°)

The end of broadcasting 
In early 2014, it was rumored that the Wertachtal site was going to be completely destroyed by May 2014. The newest transmitter, installed in 2003, was dismantled and reinstalled at transmitter site in Nauen, where it was used with a rotatable antenna installed in 1964. Some other equipment was bought by Austrian broadcaster Österreichische Rundfunksender GmbH for its site at Moosbrunn. Anything that couldn't be sold was scrapped.
At the end of November 2014, the last pillars of the site were removed. In 2015, scrap metal and any remaining equipment were removed.
The site is used since 2017 as a solar power station, with a power of 35 MWc.

See also  
 CKCX, similar technical configuration, operating out of Sackville, New Brunswick, Canada

References

External links 
 
 
 
 
 This article was partly or entirely translated from the corresponding article in the German Wikipedia titled "Kurzwellensendeanlage Wertachtal " .

1969 establishments in Germany
2014 disestablishments in Germany
Communication towers in Germany
Shortwave radio stations
Demolished buildings and structures in Germany
Pages with unreviewed translations